is the ninth and final single by Shiori Takei, released on February 28, 2007, under the Giza Studio label. The single reached #94 rank first week. It charted for 1 week and sold over 1,385 copies.

Track listing
All songs has been written by Shiori Takei

composer: Kouji Goto/arranger: Satoru Kobayashi

composer: Nao Kimura/arranger: NAKEDGRUN
 (less vocal)

References

2007 singles
2007 songs
Being Inc. singles
Giza Studio singles